Sebastian Zawadzki (born 14 October 1991) is a Polish-born composer and pianist living in Copenhagen who has been releasing albums since 2014 as well as composing and arranging music for a wide array of media including TV and films. In his works he incorporates elements of classical, electronic and jazz music.

In April 2018, Zawadzki released a postclassical minimalistic album Norn inspired by an extinct language norn for string quartet, piano and ambient synths. In July 2017, Zawadzki released his third album Between the Dusk of a Summer Night inspired by William Ernest Henley's poetry. It is a neoclassical work performed by Budapest Symphony Orchestra and soloists, combined with electronics and nature sounds. This work integrates musicians across the different music genres.

Early life and career
Zawadzki was born and raised in Toruń in Poland. After finishing the high school he moved to Denmark.
He accomplished his studies at the Rhythmic Music Conservatory in Copenhagen, the Academy of Music in Cracow and the ASCAP Film Scoring Workshop with Richard Bellis in Los Angeles in 2016.

Solo works 
Zawadzki started out his music career as a jazz pianist at the young age. His first album was released by Polish record label For-tune Records – first of them Luminescence (2014) includes minimalistic improvised solo piano compositions that were recorded in RecPublica Studios in Poland. The second album Euphony (2015)) is written for an expanded ensemble consisting of string quartet and jazz piano trio. Zawadzki was influenced by improvised music and classical music from a young age. As a result of his studies he wrote classical pieces - one of them is "Concerto for Bassoon and Chamber Orchestra" (2016), that had its premiere at IX Festiwal Nowego Miasta in Warsaw (2016).

During 2017, Zawadzki began to explore new ways creating sounds – he worked on projects involving classical instrumentalists and ensembles combined with electronic instruments - mostly modular synthesizers. The first album in more experimental stylistic is Between the Dusk of a Summer Night (2017), that involves Budapest Symphonic Orchestra, soloists and ambient electronic. Recordings took place in Copenhagen and Budapest in June 2017. 
The next project by Zawadzki is called Norn (2018). Music is written for a string quartet, bazantar, flute, ambient modular synthesizer and two voices, is maintained in a similar convention as Between the Dusk of a Summer Night. Zawadzki has also performed his music at several festivals including works from his albums.

Collaborations 
Zawadzki also works as a film composer, arranger and conductor. His work can be found on several film productions.
He also collaborated with Copenhagen Philharmonic (Danish Symphony Orchestra) from whom he got a commission to rearrange music of other bands for a full symphonic orchestra (among others music of bands When Saints Go Machine Den Sorte Skole, Lowly). He collaborated as well with an oscar-winning composer Jan A.P. Kaczmarek – he used to orchestrate his film music and concert music.

Discography

Solo albums
 Spirituality (2020,  Sebastian Zawadzki Music)
 Norn (2018, Sebastian Zawadzki Music)
 Between the Dusk of a Summer Night (2017, Sebastian Zawadzki Music)
 Euphony (2015, For-tune Records)
 Luminescence (2014, For-tune Records)

Film Scores
 Aurora Vega by Sicilla Luna (DK, 2018)
 Mr. Genovese by Daniela Arguello (US, 2018)
 How You See Me by Kathryn Harriman (US, 2017)
 Living the Mountain by Sinjun Balabanoff (US, 2017)
 Knyttet til Helvede. Paradis by Sicilla Luna (DK, 2017)
 1984 by Mads Mengel (DK, 2016)
 Nu Vandrer Livet by Sicilla Luna (DK, 2016)
 United, We Save by Iben Ravn (DK, 2015)

Collaborations
 Faith (2016, Paweł Wszołek Quintet, For-tune Records)
 Choice (2014, Paweł Wszołek Quartet, Fresh Sounds Records)
 Tåge (2013, Zawadzki/Praśniewski/Wośko Trio, Multikulti Records)
 Tone Raw (2012, Tone Raw, Song of Songs Records)

References

External links
 Official Website
 Sebastian Zawadzki at IMDb
 Interview with Sebastian Zawadzki at klubfilmowy.com

Polish composers
21st-century Polish pianists
Postminimalist composers
Experimental composers
21st-century classical composers
Polish jazz pianists
Male film score composers
Polish film score composers
Polish emigrants to Denmark
1991 births
People from Toruń
Living people
Male pianists
20th-century male musicians
21st-century male musicians
Male jazz musicians